The women's 100 metres at the 1938 European Athletics Championships was held in Vienna, at the time part of German Reich, at Praterstadion on 17 September 1938.

Medalists

Results

Final
17 September

Semi-finals
17 September

Semi-final 1

Semi-final 2

Heats
17 September

Heat 1

Heat 2

Heat 3

Heat 4

Heat 5

Heat 6

Participation
According to an unofficial count, 21 athletes from 10 countries participated in the event.

 (1)
 (2)
 (3)
 (3)
 (1)
 (1)
 (3)
 (3)
 (1)
 (3)

References

100 metres
100 metres at the European Athletics Championships
Euro